John Hawkins (born 8 June 1949) is a Canadian athlete. He competed in the men's high jump at the 1972 Summer Olympics.

References

1949 births
Living people
Athletes (track and field) at the 1972 Summer Olympics
Athletes (track and field) at the 1970 British Commonwealth Games
Athletes (track and field) at the 1974 British Commonwealth Games
Canadian male high jumpers
Olympic track and field athletes of Canada
Sportspeople from Kelowna
Commonwealth Games medallists in athletics
Commonwealth Games silver medallists for Canada
Pan American Games track and field athletes for Canada
Athletes (track and field) at the 1971 Pan American Games
Universiade bronze medalists for Canada
Universiade medalists in athletics (track and field)
Medalists at the 1973 Summer Universiade
Medallists at the 1970 British Commonwealth Games